Bara Belutestan-e Palkaneh (also Romanized as Bara Belūṭestān-e Palkāneh; also known as Barā Belūjestān and Bāyevand) is a village in Jalalvand Rural District, Firuzabad District, Kermanshah County, Kermanshah Province, Iran. At the 2006 census, its population was 57, in 11 families.

References 

Populated places in Kermanshah County